Deh Pirangan, also rendered as Deh Birangan and Deh Parangan, may refer to:
 Deh Pirangan-e Bala